Matthew Condon  (born 1962) is a prize-winning Australian writer and journalist.

Biography
Educated at the University of Queensland and the Goethe Institute, Bremen, Germany, he is the author of ten novels and short story collections, including The Lulu Magnet, A Night at the Pink Poodle, The Motorcycle Cafe, and The Pillow Fight.  The Trout Opera, an epic novel that took him more than ten years to write, examines the Australian character through its chief protagonist Wilfred Lampe, a rabbiter and farm hand who spends his entire life in the township of Dalgety, on the banks of the Snowy River. The Sydney Daily Telegraph described the novel as "an instant classic".

In 2013, Condon published Three Crooked Kings, the first part of a biography of former Queensland Police Commissioner Terry Lewis who was charged in 1989 and later jailed on multiple corruption charges.  The book was based on Condon's extensive interviews with Lewis and others as well as archival material.  The biography is continued in Jacks and Jokers (2014) and  All Fall Down (2015).

By 2019 the author was writing for The Weekend Australian Magazine, is the father of three children, and based in Byron Bay, New South Wales.

In late 2020 he released a podcast in conjunction with Whooshkaa Studios, "Ghost Gate Road", an investigation into the Queensland criminal Vince O'Dempsey and circumstances surrounding the Whiskey Au Go Go nightclub firebombing in 1973 and the murder of Barbara McCulkin and her two children in 1974.

He was awarded the Medal of the Order of Australia in the 2019 Australia Day Honours for "service to the community".

Bibliography

Novels
The Motorcycle Cafe, 1988
Usher, 1991
The Ancient Guild of Tycoons, 1994
A Night at the Pink Poodle, 1995
The Pillow Fight, 1998
Lime Bar, 2001
The Trout Opera, 2007
Mulligan: On Being a Hack Golfer, 2007

Short fiction
"Tattoo" (1996) in Original Sin (ed. Robyn Sheahan)

Short story collections
The Lulu Magnet, 1996

Non-Fiction
Brisbane, 2010, written about the city Brisbane, where Matthew grew up.
Three Crooked Kings, 2013
Jacks and Jokers, 2014
All Fall Down, 2015
Little Fish Are Sweet, 2016
The Night Dragon, 2019

Children's Fiction
The Tunnel, 1997

Edited
Smashed: Australian Drinking Stories, 1996

Awards and nominations

New South Wales Premier's Literary Awards, Fiction, 1989: shortlisted for The Motorcycle Cafe
NBC Banjo Awards, NBC Banjo Award for Fiction, 1992: shortlisted for Usher
NBC Banjo Awards, NBC Banjo Award for Fiction, 1995: shortlisted for The Ancient Guild of Tycoons
Aurealis Award for best fantasy short story, 1996: shortlisted for "Tattoo"
Warana Writers' Awards, Steele Rudd Award, 1996: winner for A Night at the Pink Poodle
Steele Rudd Award, 1997: joint winner for The Lulu Magnet
New South Wales Premier's Literary Awards, Christina Stead Prize for Fiction, 2008: shortlisted for The Trout Opera 
Queensland Premier's Literary Awards, Best Fiction Book, 2008: shortlisted for The Trout Opera
Australia-Asia Literary Award, 2008: longlisted
John Oxley Library Award, 2013 for Three Crooked Kings
 Medal of the Order of Australia (OAM) 26 January 2019
 Queensland Literary Awards, Queensland Premier's Award for a work of State Significance, 2019: shortlisted for The Night Dragon

References

External links
Matthew Condon at Random House Australia
Matthew Condon OAM in Conversation with Susan Johnson Interview (State Library of Queensland)

1962 births
20th-century Australian novelists
20th-century Australian male writers
21st-century Australian novelists
Australian male novelists
Australian male short story writers
Living people
Journalists from Queensland
Writers from Queensland
20th-century Australian short story writers
21st-century Australian short story writers
21st-century Australian male writers
University of Queensland alumni
Recipients of the Medal of the Order of Australia